This is a list of Penn Quakers football players in the NFL Draft.

Key

Selections

Notable undrafted players
Note: No drafts held before 1920

References

Penn

Penn Quakers NFL Draft